Qi Wusheng (born May 20, 1944 in Weihai) is a Chinese football coach and a former international player.

Playing career
Despite being born in Shandong, Qi would go on to play for teams within Liaoning before he would be selected for the Chinese national team. As a footballer, he played as a centre back and was known for his extraordinary ability and superb running game. His wealth of experience was limited due to the Chinese Cultural Revolution. However, he was still able to play within the 1976 AFC Asian Cup and help China to a third-place finish before he retired.

Managerial career 
After he retired from playing, Qi took the Somalia head coach position with little success before returning to China, where he mainly took on numerous coaching positions for youth teams or as an assistant manager positions. After years of working his way up through these positions in the 1986 league season he took on his first major job within China as the Guangzhou Head coach where he guided them to mid-table seventh within the league. His management saw Guangzhou become a mid-table team for the next several years until ambitious side Dalian became interested in Qi Wusheng's coaching style of a focused, solid defense to act as the basis for the teams attack. After winning the Chinese FA Cup in 1992 with Dalian the Chinese national team became interested within his services after they replaced Klaus Schlappner as the Chinese Head coach. Qi would go on to manage the national team to a silver medal in the 1994 Asian Games football tournament. While he experienced some success with the team he could not guide China to a place in the FIFA World Cup and was replaced by Bob Houghton after he resigned. He would take a position with Wuhan Hongjinlong before spending several seasons with Yunnan Hongta F.C. until the club merged with Chongqing Lifan F.C. and Qi was released. After a short spell with Tianjin Teda F.C. he would return to Guangzhou to help manage them to push for promotion back into the top tier, unable to achieve this he would leave at the end of the 2006 league season.

Honours

As a player
China
AFC Asian Cup Third Place: 1976

As a manager
Dalian
Chinese FA Cup: 1992

Meizhou Kejia
China League Two: 2015

China
Asian Games Silver medal: 1994

References

External links
Qi Wusheng Interview (1)
 Qi Wusheng Interview (2)
 Qi Wusheng Interview (3)
 Qi Wusheng Interview with Sina

1944 births
Living people
People from Weihai
Chinese footballers
Footballers from Shandong
Liaoning F.C. players
China international footballers
Chinese football managers
Somalia national football team managers
China national football team managers
1996 AFC Asian Cup managers
Guangzhou F.C. managers
Footballers at the 1974 Asian Games
1976 AFC Asian Cup players
Association football defenders
Meizhou Hakka F.C. managers
Asian Games competitors for China
Chinese expatriate football managers
Chinese expatriate sportspeople in Somalia
Expatriate football managers in Somalia
Dalian Shide F.C. managers
Tianjin Jinmen Tiger F.C. managers